CEA Technologies is an Australian defence contractor that primarily supplies the Royal Australian Navy. The company was established in 1983.

History
CEA Technologies was established in 1983, founded by two retired Royal Australian Navy personnel, Ian Croser and David Gaul.  Employing over 400 employees, it is Australia's largest majority owned defence company. CEA specialises in the design, development and manufacture of radar and communications systems for civil and military applications.
In 2016 Ian Croser was the inaugural recipient of the Australian Naval Institute McNeil Prize presented to an individual from Australian industry who has made an outstanding contribution to the capabilities of the Royal Australian Navy.

Facilities

The head office of CEA Technologies is located in Fyshwick, Australian Capital Territory. Currently the head office is located in three separate but linked buildings, CEA is expanding to build a fourth building on the adjacent block. Approximately one third of the staff are engineers covering all necessary disciplines needed to design and develop leading edge radar and military grade communications products.  A skilled production group produce printed circuit board assemblies and mechanical assemblies in small to medium production runs. In addition to the administration and engineering offices and laboratories, the buildings also house a small manufacturing and assembly facility, and an indoor antenna test facility.  A mobile outdoor antenna test facility is used to support field testing and proving of radar and antenna systems.

CEA also has facilities/offices in Adelaide, South Australia, Melbourne, Victoria, Perth, Western Australia, and San Diego, California.

Products and services

CEAFAR uses six square, fixed-face arrays installed in the ship's deckhouse.

A land-based variant of CEAFAR, named Ground Based Multi-Mission Radar (GBMMR), uses six enlarged fixed-face AESA arrays mounted on a heavy truck; it was shown to operate with IRIS-T SL medium-range ground-based air defense system during its test launches in 2014 and was subsequently offered for Egypt's purchase of IRIS-T SL systems, but lost to TRML-4D and TwinVis radars produced by Hensoldt.

CEATAC includes four small fixed-face AESA arrays mounted on a Hawkei PMV light truck, while CEAOPS is a scaled version with a large single-faced rotating AESA array and four small fixed-face arrays mounted on a HX77 heavy truck. 

CEA has provided integrated communications systems to the Armidale class patrol boat.

CEA originally supplied and now supports vessel traffic service systems to several sites around Australia and internationally.

CEA also researches, develops, and manufactures missile fire-control systems, wideband antenna systems,  maritime integrated communications systems, and Harbour and coastal surveillance systems.

References

External links
 

Defence companies of Australia
Electronics companies of Australia